Confidencias may refer to:

Confidencias (Rocío Dúrcal album) (1981)
Confidencias (Alejandro Fernández album) (2013)